The European Public Prosecutor's Office (EPPO) is an independent body of the European Union (EU) with juridical personality, established under the Treaty of Lisbon between 22 of the 27 states of the EU following the method of enhanced cooperation. It is based in Kirchberg, Luxembourg City alongside the Court of Justice of the European Union (CJEU) and the European Court of Auditors (ECA).

History

Early proposals
It was strongly backed by the former Commissioner for Justice, Freedom and Security, Franco Frattini as part of plans to strengthen the Eurojust agency. Frattini stated in August 2007 that he is "convinced that Europe will have its general prosecutor in the future" and suggested that the commission was just waiting for the treaty to come into force. He stated that a prosecutor "could prove useful" in areas "where important European interests are at stake", namely in dealing with financial crime, fraud and counterfeiting at European level.

The signing, in late 2007, of the Lisbon Treaty by all Member States of the European Union, which refers explicitly to the idea of creating a European Public Prosecutor's Office to combat crimes affecting the financial interests of the Union and, where appropriate, to combat serious crime with cross-border dimension, resulted in the conclusion of an International Seminar in Madrid to study the new institution and the possibilities of its implementation. The seminar was called by the Spanish Attorney General Cándido Conde-Pumpido, and was led by Prosecutors Jorge Espina and Isabel Vicente Carbajosa. The presentations, discussions and conclusions of the meeting were collected in a book, "The future European Public Prosecutor's Office", in English and Spanish, and have served to date to guide the proposals and jobs that have been carried out in the implementation of this institution.

Following the short selling of certain euro-zone financial products in 2009 and 10, Spain proposed the EU enact the European Public Prosecutor's Office provision so the post could co-ordinate legal action in retaliation. "Spain wants the European Union to use a planned public prosecutor's office for the region to protect the euro currency against speculators", Spanish attorney general Cándido Conde-Pumpido said in March 2010.

In March 2010 Eurojust cited the European Public Prosecutor's Office as a potential solution to the problem of cross border crime in the EU. Despite opposition from some member states seeing it as impinging on their sovereignty (partly due to the necessary harmonisation of legal codes), Eurojust set up a working group to study the idea.

Spanish Presidency draft for the implementation of the EPPO 
In March 2010, during the Spanish Presidency, the Spanish Attorney General Cándido Conde-Pumpido officially launched a draft for the implementation of the European Prosecutor, pursuant to the provision of Article 86 of the Treaty of Lisbon. Conde-Pumpido, speaking with the President of the Commission of Justice and Home Affairs of the European Parliament, Juan Fernando López Aguilar, and the Spanish Secretary of State for the European Union (SEUE), Diego Lopez Garrido, presented a technical project, developed from the conclusions of the International Conference convened by the Spanish Prosecutor in 2008 and 2009, which would be discussed later in the Luxembourg Council.

The creation of this institution was subsequently discussed, according to the Spanish proposal, by the meeting of Ministers for Justice and Home Affairs held in Luxembourg on 27 April 2010, but its implementation was suspended until a new discussion in 2013.

Seminar of the Belgian Presidency and Eurojust in Bruges 
On 21 and 22 September 2010, Eurojust, in co-operation with the Belgian Presidency of the Council of the European Union, held a strategic seminar, "Eurojust and the Lisbon Treaty: towards more effective action", "Establishment of the European Public Prosecutor's Office from Eurojust?", at the College of Europe in Bruges, Belgium.

The goals of the seminar were the development of Eurojust in light of the Lisbon Treaty and the possible establishment of a European Public Prosecutor's Office from Eurojust under Article 86 TFEU.

Barroso Commission proposals 
The European Commission President Jose Manuel Barroso said on 12 September 2012 in his speech to the European Parliament on the state of the Union, that the next presentation of a proposal for the creation of a European Public Prosecutor would come soon, based on "commitment to uphold the rule of law ".

On 17 July 2013 the European Commission, at the initiative of Vice-president Viviane Reding and Commissioner Algirdas Semeta, proposed a regulation for the establishment of a, European Public Prosecutor's Office (EPPO).

The proposal was then discussed by the representatives of the EU Member States' experts under the specific procedure set by Article 86 of the Treaty. The following 3 main options were considered within the range of options concerning the scope of the initiative to tackle offences against PIF (protection of financial interests):

 Doing nothing – criminal investigations of PIF offences are (still) conducted by Member State authorities exclusively;
 Setting-up the EPPO with a limited mandate (PIF offences) – EPPO has priority competence to order investigations and direct prosecutions into PIF offences
 Setting up the EPPO with an extended mandate (PIF offences and serious cross-border crimes) – EPPO has exclusive/shared competence to order investigations and direct prosecutions into PIF offences and other serious cross-border crimes (money laundering, corruption, accounting offences).

Besides these three options regarding scope, the Commission needed to consider a series of significant legal, institutional and organisational matters (relationship with Eurojust, OLAF, national authorities, judicial review) which could be formulated as sub-options. Moreover, particular procedural issues (EP involvement, legislative process, what if unanimity requirements are not met, enhanced co-operation with which member states, etc.) needed to be considered in these options. In accordance with Article 86 the proposal could include one or more regulations covering different aspects of the setting up of an EPPO. Soft law instruments were not relevant as legislative measures were needed to address criminal offences and law enforcement.

Likely impacts will include a more effective, dissuasive and equivalent criminal law protection of the Union's financial interests. Irregularities affecting the European budget may reach or exceed 1 Billion Euro per year, from which around €280 million could be suspected EU fraud cases to be investigated within the EPPO's competence. This amount could be significantly reduced if the EPPO were to direct investigations and prosecutions throughout the EU, acting on all cases of PIF offences. Moreover, economies of scale might be achieved for the benefit of justice budgets of participating Member States, due to a streamlining of the judicial procedures involving EU financial interests across the EU.

Depending on how the relationship between the EPPO and the national authorities would be defined, the impact would be primarily on national police and judicial authorities, which would certainly have to cope with the new framework for investigations and prosecutions ordered by the EPPO. The administrative burden would depend on the new relations established between the EPPO and the national authorities, and whether the initiative would impose new information obligations on Member States.

Preparatory work, in particular the 2001 Green paper on the establishment of a European Prosecutor, was taken into consideration. Existing studies and evaluations, in particular the Criminal Justice Systems Study, the Euroneeds Study, the Pretrial investigative model rules, the Spanish Presidency Report, officially launched in Brussels in March 2010, etc. and studies regarding Eurojust, provided valuable input.

National and European Parliaments
In November 2013 the Commission concluded that the establishment of a European Public Prosecutor's Office complied "with the principle of subsidiarity" in a report addressing the issue, after it was raised by 14 national parliamentary chambers in 11 Member States. The European Parliament subsequently voted in favour of the commission's proposal to set up the body. On 23 September 2019, the European Parliament and the Council of the European Union agreed on appointing Laura Codruța Kövesi as European Chief Prosecutor.

Role and structure
The role of the EPPO is to investigate and prosecute fraud against the budget of the European Union and other crimes against the EU's financial interests including fraud concerning EU funds of over €10,000 and cross-border VAT fraud cases involving damages above €10 million. Previously, only state authorities could investigate and prosecute these crimes and could not act beyond their borders. OLAF, Eurojust and Europol similarly had no ability to act. The body is intended to be decentralised, based around European Delegated Prosecutors located in each participating Member State. The central office consists of a European Chief Prosecutor supported by 22 European Prosecutors, as well as technical and investigatory staff. The EPPO may request a suspect's arrest, but this must be confirmed by the relevant state authority.

The EPPO has a two-tired structure and is described as a hybrid set-up. The European Chief Prosecutor heads the EPPO, represents it externally, and presides over its college. Two deputies assist the chief prosecutor and function as European Chief Prosecutor in the absence of the chief prosecutor. The determination of the working language of the EPPO is a decision-making matter of the College of the EPPO. Since 30 September 2020, Art. Paragraph 1 of the EPPO Decision 002/2020 stipulates that English is the working language for operational and administrative activities. According to Art. 1(2) of the same decision, the French language shall be used in conjunction with English in communications with the ECJ.

During the establishment of the EPPO, an interim director performed the duties pursuant to Art. 20 of the Regulation (EU) 2017/1939. According to Art. 20 para. 1 lit. a of the Regulation (EU) 2017/1939, an official of the commission was to be appointed as Interim Director after consultation of the council. He was responsible for the interim administrative apparatus and undertook, for example, recruitment (service contracts, etc.), see Art. 20 (2) of Regulation (EU) 2017/1939 and the provision of financial liquidity for the initial phase of the EPPO as well as the search for a suitable location in Luxembourg.

The College (Governing Body) 
The College of the EPPO consists of the European Chief Prosecutor and one European Prosecutor per participating Member State – two of whom function as Deputies for the European Chief Prosecutor.

European Prosecutors 

The European Prosecutors are distinct from the European Delegated Prosecutors and the European Chief Prosecutor. The European Prosecutors supervise the European Delegated Prosecutors, who conduct investigations on the ground in the participating Member States. At the end of July 2020, the first cohort of European Prosecutors were appointed by the Council of the EU. On 28 September 2020, the European Public Prosecutors were sworn in before the judge responsible at the European Court of Justice.

The decisions of the college are based on internal decision-making rules (Procedural Rules).

The Permanent Chambers of the EPPO 
The Permanent Chambers of the EPPO each consist of three members. They are two European Prosecutors and, as chairperson, the European Chief Prosecutor or one of his/her deputies, or a European Prosecutor, cf. Art. 10 of the EPPO Regulation. The Chambers are responsible for controlling the investigations of the European Delegated Prosecutors. The Chambers decide above all on the filing of charges or the discontinuation of proceedings. The right of evocation of Art. 27 of Regulation (EU) 2017/1939 can also be ordered by the Chamber.

European Delegated Prosecutors (core of the EPPO's investigative work) 
Looking at the EPPO's structure hierarchically, the European Delegated Prosecutors are below the Permanent Chambers. The European Delegated Prosecutors carry out their work locally, in their respective member states. In their work, they are independent, i.e. free from instructions by national authorities. At the national level, the European Delegated Prosecutors are responsible for prosecuting PIF offences (see Brodowski for an overview). According to an internal EPPO agreement, there will be 140 European Delegated Prosecutors in the member states.

The table below lists the number of candidates proposed and appointed per country (as of 2 August 2021):

Source: EPPO News "European Delegated Prosecutors Overview per Country"

The Finnish Delay 
When the EPPO launched its operations on June 1, 2021, Finland and Slovenia had failed to appoint their respective European Delegated Prosecutors. In Finland, the delay was due to a debate between the Finnish government wishing to only appoint part-time prosecutors because of a low expected workload, while European Chief Prosecutor Laura Kövesi insisted all European Delegated Prosecutors were to work on a full-time contract. A compromise was worked out in the beginning of June 2021 and the college appointed the Finnish European Delegated Prosecutor a month later.

The Janša Appointment Affair 
Shortly before the repeatedly postponed but then set 1 June 2021 starting date of the EPPO, it emerged that Slovenia's acting head of government Janez Janša prevented the selection and nomination of two Slovenian European Delegated Prosecutors. In the wake of this, Slovenia's then Minister for Justice Lilijana Kozlovič  resigned from her post on 27 May 2021. Kozlovič belongs to the smaller ruling party SMC, and had asked the independent Prosecutorial Council to appoint two suitable candidates. ORF and other media reported that Janša might have opposed the nomination of the two prosecutors because they had also been involved in investigations against him in the past. Zdravko Počivalšek, Slovenia's Minister of Economy and head of the coalition party SMC, also intervened in the dispute. Počivalšek considered the appointment of only one European Delegated Prosecutor from Slovenia by Janša - the compromise Didier Reynders, EU Justice Commissioner, had proposed as an interim solution - to be an overstepping of competence by the government, the government to which he himself belongs. Počivalšek criticised the EU for exerting pressure in the matter of the hasty appointment of the European Delegated Prosecutors and pointed out that participation in the EU authority was voluntary. The European Chief Prosecutor countered and referred to the very long preparation time. She considers the non-appointment or untimely appointment to be a bad omen, so to speak.

The issue gained prominence as it coincided with Slovenia taking over the rotating presidency of the Council of the EU on July 1, 2021, causing many Members of the European Parliament and even European Commission President Ursula von der Leyen to urge Janša to swiftly appoint the Slovenian European Delegated Prosecutors during a parliamentary plenary debate.

Legislative procedure through enhanced cooperation
The European Commission proposed a regulation on the establishment of a Public Procecutor's Office on 17 July 2013, based on a mandate in the Treaty of Lisbon to set up such an office.  However, on 7 February 2017 the Council concluded that no consensus existed among the member states on the proposed regulation.  As a result, 17 EU member states (Austria, Belgium, Bulgaria, Croatia, Czechia, Estonia, Finland, France, Germany, Greece, Latvia, Lithuania, Luxembourg, Romania, Slovakia, Slovenia, and Spain) requested on 14 February 2017 that the proposal be referred to the European Council for their consideration.  After no agreement was reached at the European Council on 9 March 2017, 16 members states (the prior 17 less Austria, Estonia and Latvia, plus Cyprus and Portugal) notified the European Parliament, the Council and the commission on 3 April 2017 that they would proceed with establishing the EPPO by the use of enhanced cooperation.  This was done under TFEU Article 86, which allows for a simplified enhanced cooperation procedure which does not require authorization from the council to proceed. The participating member states agreed on the legislative text to establish the EPPO on 8 June 2017.  By this point, Latvia and Estonia had begun participating in the enhanced cooperation procedure.  The proposal was approved by the European Parliament on 5 October 2017, and on 12 October 2017 the regulation was given final approval by the 20 participating member states, which had grown to include Austria and Italy. The EPPO did not have authority to begin investigating or prosecuting crimes until a decision of the Commission approved this, which per the terms of the Regulation could not take place until 3 years after the entry into force of the Regulation in November 2017.  On 6 May 2021 the commission's decision launching operations was adopted, with a starting date of 1 June 2021.

EPPO members 

22 EU member states participate in the enhanced cooperation. The original regulation was joined by 20 member states. Other member states, apart from Denmark which has an opt-out from the area of freedom, security and justice (AFSJ), are permitted to join subsequently.  (Ireland also has an opt-out from the AFSJ, but the form of its opt-out is more flexible, giving it the ability to opt-in on a case-by-case basis.)

Following the Rutte III Cabinet taking office the Netherlands officially requested to join the EPPO on 14 May 2018. Their participation was approved by the commission on 1 August 2018.  Malta requested to join on 14 June 2018, and their participation was approved on 7 August 2018.  In a speech in April 2019, Stefan Löfven, Prime Minister of Sweden, stated that he would be recommending to the Swedish Parliament that the country join the EPPO. On 13 November 2019, on behalf of his government, he declared that joining the EPPO is first among three objectives on EU policy for his government. According to the commission, the Swedish government indicated that Sweden planned to join sometime in 2022.

Members

 Austria
 Belgium
 Bulgaria
 Croatia
 Cyprus
 Czech Republic
 Estonia
 Finland
 France
 Germany
 Greece
 Italy
 Latvia
 Lithuania
 Luxembourg
 Malta
 Netherlands
 Portugal
 Romania
 Slovakia
 Slovenia
 Spain

Non-participants (may join any time)

 Hungary
 Poland
 Sweden

Opt-out from AFSJ
 Denmark
 Ireland (opt-in)

Legal basis
The EPPO was provided for in Article 86 of the Treaty on the Functioning of the European Union by the Treaty of Lisbon. The article states the following:

Establishment
 The Council of the European Union, by a special legislative procedure, may establish a European Public Prosecutor's Office on the basis of Eurojust.
 This must be done by unanimity in the council and with the consent of the European Parliament.
 If the Council cannot reach unanimity, a group of at least nine member states may refer a draft to the European Council.
 Those member states may also proceed to establish enhanced co-operation between themselves after informing Parliament, the Council and the commission.

Role
 The office shall, in liaison with Europol, be responsible for investigating, prosecuting and bringing to judgment those connected to offences against the EU's financial interests.
 It shall exercise this function in the relevant national courts.
 The regulations establishing the office shall determine rules governing how it performs its duties including the admissibility of evidence.
 The European Council may amend the treaty, after consulting the commission and gaining the consent of Parliament, to extend its powers to include serious cross border crime.

List of European Chief Prosecutors

Prospects for the future
So far, the limited mission of the EPPO is to investigate, prosecute and bring to judgement, before national courts, persons suspected of offences affecting the financial interests of the Union. The so-called ‘PIF Directive’ sets out what those offences are. But the mission of EPPO may also be extended in the future to cover other serious cross-border crimes.
The functions of EPPO are carried out by European delegated prosecutors in the participating member states who have the same powers as national public prosecutors in addition to the powers conferred on them by Union law. For instance, the European delegated prosecutor can issue an EAW or request that a competent national judicial authority issues an EAW.

See also
 Area of freedom, security and justice
 European Anti-Fraud Office

References

External links

 European Public Prosecutor's Office

Enhanced cooperation
European Union law
Political offices of the European Union
European Union organisations based in Luxembourg
Prosecution